Bengkulu, historically spelled as Bencoolen or Benkoelen , is a province of Indonesia on the island of Sumatra.

Bengkulu, Bencoolen, or Benkoelen may also refer to:
 Bengkulu (city), the capital of the province
 PS Bengkulu, a football club based in the city of Bengkulu
 Bengkulu language or Central Malay
 Bengkulu people, a subgroup of Malay Indonesians
 , formerly Bengkulu TV, a television channel in Bengkulu
 University of Bengkulu
 Bencoolen (ship), several ships
 British Bencoolen, a former British possession in Sumatra
 Bencoolen Street, in Singapore
 Bencoolen MRT station, in Singapore
 Benkoelen Residency, a former residency of the Dutch East Indies

See also
 Bencoolen (disambiguation)